Justin Jeremy van Tergouw (born 20 April 2000 in Utrecht, Netherlands) is a Dutch darts player. He won the 2017 BDO World Youth Darts Championship and 2018 BDO World Youth Darts Championship.

Career

Youth career
In 2015, van Tergouw won the World Youth Masters, beating Joshua Richardson of England in the Final.
In 2016 he won WDF Europe Youth Cup and won the World Youth Masters for the second year in a row. Justin also qualified for the 2016 PDC World Youth Championship through an international qualifier. He lost his tooth the First round from Dean Reynolds.
In 2017 he won the BDO World Youth Darts Championship beating Nathan Girvan of Scotland in the Final at the Lakeside Country Club in Frimley Green. Later that year he played in the 2017 PDC World Youth Championship where he went through to the Third round before losing from Josh Payne.
In 2018 Justin qualified for the 2018 BDO World Youth Darts Championship Final where he beat Killian Heffernan of Ireland.

On 5 August 2018 Van Tergouw picked up his first Senior title by winning the Belgium Masters by beating Current British Darts Organisation World Champion Glen Durrant by 2 sets to 1.

World Championship Performances

PDC
 2016: First round (lost to Dean Reynolds 0–6) (Youth)
 2017: Third round (lost to Josh Payne 5–6) (Youth)
 2018: Second round (lost to Jarred Cole 3–6) (Youth)

BDO
 2017: Winner (beat Nathan Girvan 3–0) (Youth)
 2018: Winner (beat Killian Heffernan 3–1) (Youth)

References

External links
 WDF Boys Rankings
 BDO Rankings
 Profile and stats on Darts Database
 Profile on Darts1 (german)

Living people
Dutch darts players
British Darts Organisation players
2000 births